Richard K. Acres (May 17, 1934 – June 14, 2012) was an American college basketball coach. He served as head men's coach of Oral Roberts University (ORU) for three seasons.

Acres played college basketball at UC Santa Barbara and semi-professionally for Kirby Shoes. He received a degree in education from UC Santa Barbara and later a master's degree from California State University, Los Angeles. After his playing career, he went into teaching, initially at Mark Twain High School. 

Acres coached at Carson High School in California from 1970 to 1982, winning the state 4A title in his last season there. He then took an assistant coaching role at Oral Roberts for the 1982–83 season under Ken Hayes. With the move, Acres was able to coach two of his sons, who were already at ORU – Mark (who would later go on to play in the National Basketball Association) and Jeff – as well as Sam Potter, who had played for Acres at Carson High. In December of that season, after a disappointing 3–5 start, Hayes was fired and Acres was installed as interim head coach. After leading the team to an 11–9 record in his time as interim coach, Acres was given the full-time head coaching job during that offseason.

The following season, Acres led the Golden Eagles to a 21–10 record, Midwestern City Conference regular season and tournament championships, and was named conference co-coach of the year with Joe Sexson of Butler. In the 1984–85 season, Acres led the Golden Eagles to a 13–15 record and resigned at the end of the season.

Besides his coaching career, Acres served as a referee for basketball, football, and baseball at the high school level. He was also a financial services professional. Acres died on June 14, 2012.

References

External links
Coaching record @ sports-reference.com

1934 births
2012 deaths
American men's basketball coaches
American men's basketball players
Basketball coaches from California
Basketball players from California
California State University, Los Angeles alumni
College men's basketball head coaches in the United States
High school basketball coaches in California
Oral Roberts Golden Eagles men's basketball coaches
Sportspeople from Santa Barbara, California
UC Santa Barbara Gauchos men's basketball players